Truth is the twelfth studio album by Japanese Jazz fusion band T-Square, who was then known as The Square. It was released on April 1, 1987. The title track is remembered in Japan as the main theme to Fuji TV's Formula One broadcasts from 1987 to 1998.

Track listing
Sources

References

T-Square (band) albums
1987 albums